Sonya Blade is a fictional character in the Mortal Kombat fighting game franchise by Midway Games and NetherRealm Studios. She debuted in the original 1992 game as the roster's sole female fighter. Inspired by martial artist Cynthia Rothrock, she is a military officer with the Special Forces.

In the storyline of the games, Sonya becomes involved with the eponymous Mortal Kombat tournament through pursuit of her archenemy, the criminal leader Kano. She subsequently joins the warriors defending Earthrealm and establishes a government agency dedicated to battling otherworldly threats. The series' rebooted timeline also depicts her as the love interest to martial arts actor Johnny Cage and the mother of their daughter Cassie.

A mainstay of the franchise, Sonya has also appeared in various media outside of the games. Reception to the character has been generally positive, with respect to her role as one of Mortal Kombats primary female fighters.

Appearances

Mortal Kombat games
Sonya Blade is one of the main heroes of the Mortal Kombat series. Hailing from Austin, Texas, she is a second-generation United States Special Forces officer who followed in the footsteps of her father, Major Herman Blade. Her impulsive personality is catalyzed by her superior and good friend Major Jackson "Jax" Briggs. Sonya also has a long-standing feud with the criminal leader Kano, who stands for everything she despises.

In the original Mortal Kombat (1992), Lieutenant Sonya Blade and her team pursue Kano, leader of the Black Dragon international crime organization. After he jumps aboard an old junk in order to escape capture, Sonya and her comrades follow him to a remote island where Shang Tsung's Mortal Kombat tournament was underway. Upon arrival, they are ambushed by Shang Tsung's personal guard and Sonya is forced to compete in order to spare her companions' lives. Shang Tsung, however, had no intention of fulfilling his end of the bargain and has her unit killed. After he is defeated by Shaolin monk Liu Kang in the final battle, Sonya teams up with movie star Johnny Cage and Kano to fight off the Shokan Prince Goro. During the battle, the island begins to crumble and she and Kano are sent to Outworld as Shang Tsung's prisoners to appease the Outworld emperor, Shao Kahn. However, Sonya is able to send a signal to Jax from Outworld and, during the events of Mortal Kombat II (1993), he travels there to find her. Jax makes contact with the other Earthrealm warriors and together they learn of Shao Kahn's scheme to invade Earth. Before and during their imprisonment meanwhile, Sonya and Kano are forced to put their differences aside and work together to survive in Outworld. She is later freed by Jax, who arrests Kano, but as soon as they pass through the portal to Earthrealm, Kano escapes and flees back to Outworld.

Sonya appears as one of a few selected Earthrealm warriors whose souls were not taken following Shao Kahn's invasion of Earth in Mortal Kombat 3 (1995). She re-encounters Kano on top of a skyscraper near his fortress and after a fight, hurls him off the roof to his apparent death. In Mortal Kombat 4 (1997), after her journey into Outworld and Shao Kahn's near destruction of Earth, Sonya becomes a member of the U.S. government's Outer World Investigation Agency (OIA). However, she continues to have conflicts with the Black Dragon, especially after its last known member, Jarek, fled to Edenia while Sonya was chasing him. This leads her and Jax to team up with Liu Kang and thunder god Raiden to free the realm from the fallen Elder God Shinnok's grasp and to prevent him from coming to Earth. After Shinnok's defeat, in which Jarek had reluctantly participated in to save himself, he tries to kill Sonya, but Jax intervenes and drops him off a cliff. After returning to Earthrealm, Jax and Sonya find the cyborg Cyrax malfunctioning in a desert. The two bring him back to OIA headquarters, where they are able to restore his humanity before helping him join the agency.

In Mortal Kombat: Deadly Alliance (2002), while on an assignment in the East, Sonya learns the OIA had been destroyed by an accomplice of the titular alliance of Shang Tsung and Quan Chi. Not long after, Raiden seeks out her aid against the Deadly Alliance and instructs her to meet with his other chosen warriors on Shang Tsung's abandoned island, where she develops a rivalry with Frost. To earn the right to pass into Outworld, each warrior has to defeat a representation of his or her adversary. To Sonya's surprise, hers is a stranger with a red dragon on his back. She is killed in battle against the Deadly Alliance's Tarkatan forces, but their victory is short-lived as the Dragon King Onaga reclaims Outworld and defeats them in turn. With his ability to raise the dead at will, he resurrects Sonya and her fallen comrades to serve as his slaves until their souls are freed by Liu Kang and Shao Kahn's enforcer Ermac during Mortal Kombat: Deception (2004).

In Mortal Kombat: Armageddon (2006), Sonya returns to Earth after Onaga's defeat, with the intention of continuing her assault on both the Black and Red Dragon clans, only to be forced to focus on a newly established threat. In her absence, the Tekunin cyber ninja clan had grown powerful enough to disrupt Earth civilization and violated the laws of Mortal Kombat by engaging in illegal interdimensional alliances with unknown parties. Sonya succeeds in downing the Tekunin's flagship, helmed by their Grandmaster Sektor. She sent in a team led by Jax to hunt for survivors, but they mysteriously vanished. Fearing for Jax's safety, she tracks the signal of a homing beacon placed on Tekunin prisoner Taven, who escaped thanks to her intervention, and eventually confronts him in Arktika to interrogate him, only to be beaten. Sonya later fights alongside her friends in the Battle of Armageddon in Edenia, only to become one of its many casualties; torn apart by an unknown opponent.

In the Mortal Kombat reboot game (2011), an alternate-timeline retelling of the first three games, Sonya teams up with Jax in his mission to bring down the Black Dragon, succeeding in seizing many of their weapons caches. However, after their key informant, Kano, is discovered to be a high-powered member of the organization, Sonya and Jax focus solely on his capture following the deaths of many of their comrades in subsequent ambushes. This leads them to the Mortal Kombat tournament on Shang Tsung's uncharted island, where Jax is captured and imprisoned, forcing Sonya to participate in the tournament in order to spare his life; during which she unwillingly becomes acquainted with Johnny Cage after repeatedly rejecting his advances. Sonya soon encounters Shang Tsung himself, but Raiden, whom she had not met yet in this timeline, intervenes before she can fight him. He enables Sonya to free a wounded Jax, but Shang Tsung destroys their extraction transport and presents Kano to Sonya as a challenge. While she emerges victorious, she is forbidden to take him prisoner. Raiden reappears and heals Jax's injuries, causing Sonya to become aware of both his presence and her crucial role in defending Earthrealm alongside his chosen warriors. After Liu Kang's victory over Shang Tsung in the first tournament, Sonya is abducted and held captive in Outworld before being rescued by Jax, but after his arms are obliterated in a confrontation with Ermac, she transports him back to Earthrealm for medical attention; missing the second tournament entirely. Sonya and Jax reunite with the other Earthrealm warriors as they assemble to fight Shao Kahn's invasion of Earthrealm but most of them are massacred by his wife, Queen Sindel; leaving Sonya and Cage among the only survivors after the Kahn's demise and Raiden accidentally killing Liu Kang.

Sonya returns as a playable character in Mortal Kombat X (2015). Two years following Shao Kahn's death, Shinnok and his forces attack Earthrealm, but General Sonya Blade, along with Johnny and Kenshi, aid Raiden in imprisoning Shinnok in his own amulet. The two later track down Quan Chi, Shinnok's second-in-command, and defeat him; restoring Jax as well as Sub-Zero and Scorpion to normal. Over the following 25 years, Sonya and Johnny marry and have a daughter, Cassie Cage, but the two later divorce; allegedly due to Sonya frequently putting work before her family. However, after Cassie defeats Shinnok and saves Earthrealm, she, Sonya, and Johnny become a family again.

In Mortal Kombat 11 (2019), Sonya, Cassie, and Jax's daughter Jacqui lead a Special Forces strike team in storming the Netherrealm before they can attack Earthrealm. After being trapped under debris, Sonya sacrifices herself to ensure the mission's success and her allies' escape, devastating Johnny and Cassie. When the keeper of time Kronika causes temporal anomalies amidst her plot to reset time, younger versions of Sonya and Johnny are brought to the present. Upon learning of what happened to her older self, she is initially outraged that she had a child with Johnny and that Cassie apparently left her behind. Just as she learns her older self ordered Cassie to do so, she is captured by the present and past versions of Kano and forced to fight for the Black Dragon's entertainment before the Special Forces rescue her. During the ensuing fight, Sonya kills Kano's younger counterpart, erasing his present self from existence. Following this, she begins to warm up to her version of Johnny and reconciles with Cassie.

Sonya appears as one of the warriors representing the Mortal Kombat universe in the non-canonical crossover game, Mortal Kombat vs. DC Universe (2008). In the story mode, Sonya is investigating the dimensional imbalance caused by Shao Kahn and Darkseid's inadvertent fusion into Dark Kahn. After defeating Catwoman, Baraka, Captain Marvel, and Green Lantern, Sonya and Jax return to their base to use a teleportation machine in an attempt to reach the DC Universe. When she finds Jax with Green Lantern, Sonya once again challenges the latter, only to be defeated and imprisoned before she and Jax escape again. When Earthrealm's heroes and Outworld's villains join forces to fight invaders from the DC universe, Sonya reluctantly teams up with Kano to track a foreign energy signal, but they are confronted and defeated by the Joker and Deathstroke. When both sides meet for one last battle, Sonya once again fights Catwoman. In the end, she is knocked unconscious while Raiden and Superman defeat Dark Kahn and separate their universes.

Character design and gameplay
There were originally no plans for Sonya's inclusion in Mortal Kombat, which was supposed to feature only six characters, and she was added only when the president of Williams gave the development team an additional six weeks (adding to its already ten months of production) and told them to polish the game. At first, the additional character was actually Jax/Stryker; when the developers decided they need a "female fighter", Sonya was created and his story was applied to her. The early Mortal Kombat series' character designer and writer John Tobias said he created "characters like Liu Kang or Shang Tsung, who represented the more mystical sides of the story, and Johnny Cage, Sonya or Jax, who came from places grounded more in reality...[Sonya and Kitana] were both important pieces of the game's fiction and archetypal structure of characters. But, player demographic was primarily a hardcore male audience and so the look and design of our female characters pandered to them back then just as they do today."

Sonya was named after one of the sisters of co-designer Ed Boon, as confirmed in Tanya's biography card in the special edition of Mortal Kombat: Deception. The character was inspired by martial artist and actress Cynthia Rothrock, who claimed, "they contacted me when I was in my prime in terms of my career, and I was too expensive for them. When I do conventions I do have a few people recognizing me for her, but I really had nothing to do with it. (...) It was a raw deal and I could have sued, but I'm not that type of person." Sonya's original actress, Elizabeth Malecki, was recruited by Daniel Pesina at a fitness club where she worked as an aerobic instructor and had no idea about video games. She also was the only one of the cast who was not a martial arts expert, but had a dance and athletics background. She said: "Sonya was supposed to be special forces and a martial artist, so I decided to pull in the army green tights. And since I was into aerobics, I gave her the thong that was so popular back then for women to wear in exercise classes." Her Sonya had some special moves like a roundhouse kick that were filmed but did not appear in the game. Malecki and some other Mortal Kombat actors later filed an unsuccessful lawsuit against Midway Games over unpaid royalties from the home versions of the game and the unauthorized use of her likeness in its sequel (in Judge Robert Gettleman's ruling, the character's name is misspelled as "Sonja").

Sonya and Kano were the least popular characters of the first game and so the team decided to replace them, saving image memory space and time for the new characters. Producers said Sonya was "chucked out" from the game in favour of the palette swapped Kitana and Mileena as part of revamping the game, so it would better compete against Street Fighter II and its popular female character Chun-Li. Sonya and Kano were promptly dropped for the first sequel and appear in Mortal Kombat II only in one of the backgrounds, chained in Kahn's Arena. At the time, Tobias said: "We still wanted to include them in the story line, so we had them captured. I don't know where or when or in what form, but Sonya and Kano will be back." However, they both soon returned as playable characters in the very next game and Sonya proved to be one of the most popular of the Mortal Kombat characters. According to Midway's Mark Turmell, Sonya's Mortal Kombat 3 actress Kerri Hoskins "started getting phone calls from kids at home because we'd published her name." Hoskins, whose martial arts training consisted of "some Tang Soo Do and a past of WWF wrestling and gymnastics," said she was asked to join the cast of MK3 after establishing a working relationship at Midway with the producers of NBA Jam. She later also voiced Sonya for Mortal Kombat 4. Sonya's later voice actresses included Beth Melewski (MK:SM), Dana Lyn Baron (MKvsDCU, MK2011), Tricia Helfer (MKX), and Ronda Rousey (MK11). Her motion actor during the Deception-Annihilation era was Carlos Pesina.

The action-adventure spin-off game Mortal Kombat: Special Forces, which was eventually released in 2000 following delays, had been originally planned to star Sonya and to have both Jax and her (with a codename of "Panther") as playable characters, but Sonya's part was dropped again due to deadline issues exacerbated by Tobias's sudden departure from the company. For the abortive project with a working title of Mortal Kombat 8 (which was cancelled in favor of Mortal Kombat vs. DC Universe), Sonya's look was considered to be "dramatically revamped" and she was to be given more character backstory, described as "the daughter of a Texas Ranger". The 2011's reboot's producer Shaun Himmerick wrote: "I love how we use Sonya in the game, I think it is really a great reference to MK and should be fun for the fans." NetherRealm Studios art director Steve Beran said: "When you look at the version of Sonya or Scorpion from the first Mortal Kombat, it's almost laughable how simple their costumes were. You have to give fans the recognizability of their favorite characters, but make it not look like Sonya's wearing a leotard and workout clothes" (as in the early games). Nevertheless, Sonya's original outfit did appear in Mortal Kombat X via downloadable content.

Sonya's original special move is "Leg Grab", a handstand leg throw that was an idea of Malecki's (with a similar cartwheel kick since Mortal Kombat 4). Her signature Fatality is the "Kiss of Death" (an idea of Daniel Pesina's), a finishing move that makes the defeated opponent burn alive into a charred skeleton. At , Sonya is one of the tallest female characters and she stands out because of her long legs. For her initial appearance in the original Mortal Kombat game, SNES Force described her as having "the best jumping skills of any character — her air punch and flying kick work well against most opponents. Her force wave is excellent for long range battles giving her a good all round performance, though she is fairly weak." According to Nintendo Power, Sonya could be a "juggling demon" in Mortal Kombat Trilogy when in hands of an experienced player. Total 64 opined she "is a nifty little fighter" in Trilogy, whose only weakness is that her attacks are lacking power when compared to some of the other characters.

Other media

Live-action and animation
Kerri Hoskins also portrayed the character in the theatrical show Mortal Kombat: Live Tour that emphasized getting young audiences into the martial arts, while the actors would travel to schools to give motivational speeches to students. Hoskins enthused that her experience in the Live Tour "was a riot" and that she felt "like a rock star." In the show, Sonya takes part in the search for the powerful Dragon Amulet, until she is taken hostage by Shao Kahn at the end the first act in Outworld, motivating Jax and Liu Kang to save both her and the world in the second act.

Bridgette Wilson-Sampras was cast as Sonya in the first Mortal Kombat movie after the filmmakers' original choice, Cameron Diaz, injured her wrist during martial arts training and dropped out. During production, Wilson was given the nickname "RoboBabe" by director Paul Anderson, and performed her own stuntwork. The character's stern personality and storyline in the film were faithful to the games, as was the depiction of her vendetta against Kano for murdering her (unnamed) partner. Kano baits her into boarding Shang Tsung's ship, where she encounters Cage and Liu Kang for the first time and engages in a standoff with Sub-Zero. Shang Tsung had conspired with Kano beforehand in arranging for him to fight Sonya at the tournament in anticipation of her defeat, which fails as Sonya defeats and kills Kano. She is later abducted by Shang Tsung and taken to the Emperor's castle in Outworld where she is challenged by Shang Tsung to final combat, which she staunchly refuses to do just before the arrival of Liu Kang, Cage and Kitana. According to the film's official magazine Mortal Kombat: The Ultimate Battle for Humanity, Shang Tsung intended for Sonya to become his queen after successfully conquering Earthrealm. Sonya was also one of the main protagonists, alongside Cage and Liu in the 1995 animated film Mortal Kombat: The Journey Begins, a prequel to the movie wherein she was voiced by Jennifer Hale.

For the 1997 sequel, Mortal Kombat: Annihilation, Sandra Hess replaced Wilson-Sampras as Sonya (Kerri Hoskins had too auditioned for the role, but did not "make the last cut of three girls" due to having no acting experience). In the film, Sonya is devastated by the death of Johnny Cage, who is killed by Kahn after saving her life. She then grudgingly joins Raiden in locating Jax, whom she rescues from, and helps him fight off, an extermination squad led by Cyrax. However, they later come into conflict with one another due to her sustained grief over Cage's death and her refusal to fill Jax in on the details of the Earthrealmers' mission, and they temporarily split apart as a result. They ultimately reunite with Liu Kang and Kitana and succeed in stopping Kahn from bringing Earth to ruin. Sonya has two fight scenes in the film, first defeating Mileena by breaking her neck in a mud pit after splitting from Jax, then squaring off against Ermac at the climax, during which Noob Saibot spawns from his chest and they assault her with repeated attacks until Jax intervenes to defeat Noob Saibot, enabling Sonya to regain the upper hand and emerge victorious against Ermac. Hess hated the mud scene due to the freezing cold, and said her favourite was the Cyrax fight. In Brent V. Friedman and Bryce Zabel's screenplays for Annihilation, Sonya forcibly drowns Mileena in deep mud in the first draft and kills Mileena with her own sai in a revised script.

Sonya was one of the lead characters in the 1996 animated TV series Mortal Kombat: Defenders of the Realm, for which she was voiced by Olivia d'Abo. She is again Jax's partner and was given a signature catchphrase ("Kombat time!"). She is a wild and impulsive character who often has personality clashes with Raiden, while her impetuousness in combat sometimes yielded consequences for her teammates. Her vendetta against Kano was explained and was explored further in two separate episodes, in which Kano was shown to have killed her partner, Wexler, who was named after Threshold writer and producer Joshua Wexler. In storylines exclusive to the show, she worked with Kitana to retrieve a pair of magical swords and befriended Kabal after learning of his disability and the subsequent prejudice he experienced. The official character guide describes her as "completely unrestrained and volatile, a la Mel Gibson in Lethal Weapon." Following the loss of her previous two partners, Sonya "has built a wall around herself to protect herself from getting hurt again and feel the guilt and pain of watching those around her perish."

For Mortal Kombat: Rebirth, director Kevin Tancharoen's 2010 short film that served as a pitch for a feature-length reboot for Warner Bros., Sonya, played by Jeri Ryan, is a lieutenant in the fictional Deacon City Police Department who makes a brief appearance during Jax's interrogation of Hanzo Hasashi (Scorpion). Ryan reprised the role for the first two episodes of Tancharoen's 2011 web series Mortal Kombat: Legacy, in which Sonya again works with Jax to bust the Black Dragon, but her obsession with Kano leads to her capture, forcing Jax and Stryker to conduct a raid on the warehouse where the Dragons are carrying out their operations. While Sonya manages to free herself during the fracas, Jax later suffers massive damage to his arms after protecting her from an explosion. Ryan was slated to return for the second season but was forced to turn it down due to her ongoing work on Body of Proof. Ryan said that she was familiar with the series but had never played the games and took the role as a favor for a friend, and that she was probably the only cast member who was not a martial artist. Ryan described her Sonya as "significantly more dressed than the video [game] version" and "a badass broad" that was "fun" to play, and was probably more believable and real world grounded in this version. It was the most physical acting she did since her role in Star Trek: Voyager a decade earlier; she noted her fight scenes were shorter than the others since she did not have much time to train, but she was helped by the fight choreographer and by Sonya's use of firearms. Tancharoen stated that Ryan could possibly return for the third season before the series ended with his departure.

Sonya Blade was one of the lead characters in the 2020 animated movie Mortal Kombat Legends: Scorpion's Revenge, who was voiced by Dexter star Jennifer Carpenter. Carpenter reprised her role in the sequel Mortal Kombat Legends: Battle of the Realms.

Jessica McNamee portrays Sonya for the 2021 reboot film Mortal Kombat. Blade is a veteran who has spent years researching the Mortal Kombat tournament and its related dragon markings, but is missing one herself. Though frustrated by her rival Kano gaining a dragon marking through sheer murder, she is forced to work with him along with Earthrealm's champions to escort Cole Young to Raiden's temple. Blade earns her dragon marking and abilities after ultimately killing Kano after he betrays them, and uses her new abilities to perform a fatality on Mileena. McNamee defined her role in the movie as "the voice of reason" with a degree of "playfulness and lightness", and expressed interest in exploring her relationship with Johnny and Cassie Cage in potential sequels.

Literature

In the Malibu Comics licensed Mortal Kombat series, Sonya appeared with all of the characters from the first game (minus Reptile) in the 1994 Blood & Thunder miniseries, the first issue of which borrowed liberally from John Tobias' comic in detailing her dogged pursuit of Kano alongside her Special Forces comrades, and his escape onto Shang Tsung's junk that is en route to the tournament, the difference being that she voluntarily enters the island grounds to question Shang Tsung directly about Kano, rather than being captured and forced to fight per the first game's storyline and the official comic by John Tobias. Her lone partner in the series was an original character named Lance, who sported a cybernetic arm (similar to Jax's metal arms in MK3) and also participates in the tournament, but in the second issue he is killed by Kano in one of only two organized fights that commenced in the entire Malibu run. In the fourth issue, when the characters are stranded in Outworld, Johnny Cage encounters the ruler of a small village who looks exactly like Sonya, and brazenly kisses her; the woman (named Aynos; "Sonya" spelled backwards) immediately sentences him to death for the infraction before the real Sonya intervenes and teams up with Cage to defeat the imposter, which sparks a friendship between the two combatants. In issue six, she handily overpowers Kano in battle but is then not seen again for the rest of the comic, and in the Tournament Edition wrap-up of the miniseries, Sonya is victorious over Mileena in a fight that begins with Mileena stabbing her, and the storyline concludes with Sonya and Jax leaving with Kano in custody. In the second six-issue miniseries, 1995's Battlewave, Sonya learns of a brutal attack on Jax, and enlists Cage's help in her investigation, but convinced that only someone from Outworld could inflict such injury, she returns to Shang Tsung's island on her own, only to be attacked by Kintaro and taken to Shao Kahn's tower. She is brainwashed by Reptile into marrying Kahn, but in the Battlewave finale, the Earth warriors disrupt the ceremony and Sonya snaps out of the trance on her own. The issue featured an additional short story titled "Every Dog Has Its Day", which explored the relationship between Sonya and Cage after she is cast in his latest movie. In the 1995 two-issue miniseries U.S. Special Forces, she and Jax work to capture an original Black Dragon character named Rojack. Sonya was the only character throughout the entire Malibu series who never referred to themselves in the third person.

The first film's novelization by Martin Delrio includes a detailed opening scene of an unsuccessful joint mission of arresting Black Dragon members by the Special Forces and an international task force, which culminates in Kano killing the task force's lieutenant who is designated therein as Sonya's murdered partner. Sonya also has a fight scene with Jade that she wins before it officially begins after she fatally kicks Jade in the head after Jade returns her bow. Sonya was described in this scene as wearing "an Army-issue T-shirt" and "tightly-laced combat boots." She also spares Kano's life in their fight, refusing to fall prey to Shang Tsung's scheme while declaring that nobody "owned" her.

In Jeff Rovin's 1995 non-canon Mortal Kombat novel, Sonya infiltrates the Black Dragon by working undercover as a criminal named Gilda Stahl. Her mission was to let them lead her to Shang Tsung—who had hired them to find an amulet hidden somewhere in China—although she had a personal interest in apprehending Kano as he had murdered her fiancé several years earlier. Both the journey and her mission go south after the unexpected intervention of Raiden, Shang Tsung, and Goro, resulting in the loss of her cover and her being abducted by Shang Tsung, but she escapes captivity after foiling a ritual sacrifice presided over by Baraka, then inconclusively fights Kano near the conclusion before he evades arrest.

In Jerome Preisler's novelization of Mortal Kombat Annihilation, Sonya strangles Mileena to death following a hard struggle.

Merchandise and promotion
Malecki appeared dressed as Sonya on GamesMaster to promote the first game in 1992. Hoskins dressed as Sonya from Mortal Kombat 3 for a workout video featured in Threshold Entertainment's The Ultimate Guide to Mortal Kombat CD-ROM release in 1995 as and as Sonya from Mortal Kombat 4 for the E3 1998 trade show. In 2011, British model Carly Baker dressed up as Sonya for both a live-action trailer titled "Sonya Blade Kasting" and an official photoshoot, alongside two other women costumed as Mileena and Kitana; all three also made appearances at The Gadget Show: World Tour that year.

Action figures of Sonya were released by Hasbro (1994), Toy Island (1996), Infinite Concepts (1999), and Palisades Toys (2000). A 1/6 scale limited-edition statue of Sonya in her primary outfit from MK2011 was released in the Mortal Kombat Enchanted Warriors line by Syco Collectibles in 2012; another, larger statue in her alternate costume was released in 2013.<ref>{{cite web |url=http://www.sycocollectibles.com/content/sonya-blade-18-statue |title=Sonya Blade 18 Statue |publisher=Syco Collectibles |access-date=2013-07-24 |archive-url=https://web.archive.org/web/20140213202546/http://sycocollectibles.com/content/sonya-blade-18-statue |archive-date=2014-02-13 |url-status=dead }}</ref> To promoted MK11, Ronda Rousey shows up in her Sonya Blade gear against Ruby Riot at WWE Elimination Chamber.

Reception
Critical reaction to Sonya Blade has been positive, with commentators noting the character's sex appeal and toughness. Brazilian magazine SuperGamePower featured her in the article about the "muses" of video games, stating that "more realistic than Chun-Li and Cammy, Sonya has reigned" between 1993 and the introduction of Lara Croft in 1996. Marcin "Gulash" Górecki of Secret Service ranked her as the second-best female fighter in the genre's history in 1996 while a 1997 article in Ação Games ranked her as the 12th overall best female video game character yet. A 1998 article in Saturn Power mentioned  among the female fight game characters that can be more deadly than their male counterparts. In 1999, actress Tamala Jones chose Sonya and Soulcalibur's Ivy Valentine as the game characters she most identified with. GamesRadar later chose Sonya as one of the iconic video game "babes" of the early 1990s era and Retro Gamer included her among the classic "strong lead female characters". In 2016, Game Revolution included her among ten best female characters in video games, stating she had "stood the test of time."

However, Sonya and Kano were the least popular characters among the players of the original Mortal Kombat, with Sonya herself soon surpassed in popularity by Kitana and Mileena. Hyper also reported a minor "controversy over the character Sonya Blade in the first Mortal Kombat. Some men complained they didn't want to kill her, and not just because they were fond of her big breasts and long legs - they just didn't feel they could hit a girl." Fan rumors surrounding Sonya in later games included a secret possibility to fight her in Mortal Kombat II and her having a "Nudality" finishing move in Mortal Kombat 3.

Sonya Blade and her actress Kerri Hoskins were both given the special award "Best Videogame Babe" by Game Players in 1995. GameDaily had her featured among "the next wave of video game babes" in 2008, further showcasing her as one of the "hottest" blondes in the video game world in 2009.Babe of the Week: Hottest Blondes (page 12), GameDaily, January 16, 2009. She was included in Unreality's Queen of the Iron Fist Tournament, winning against Anna Williams but losing to Ivy Valentine. Sonya also shared eighth place with Kitana and Mileena on the list of the "hottest" women in video games" by Complex. MTV ranked her as the second "best babe" in video games of 2011, stating that "few gaming babes portray raw sexuality better and more effectively." That same year, UGO ranked her as the third "foxiest fighting female to be ever pixelated," stating that "in her early appearances, Sonya Blade wasn't quite as sexy as other women on this list, but her moveset more than made up for it." GameFront's Ross Lincoln ranked her bust in the new game as the 32nd finest in gaming history. MSN included her among the 20 "hottest women in video game history", stating, "independent, tough, and willing to put herself on the line for her friends, Sonya Blade is the embodiment of the modern woman. Well, except for the part where she can sometimes rip your head off." In 2014, she was ranked as the 69th best looking video game woman by Brazilian GameHall's Portal PlayGame.

Game Rant included her on their 2011 list of ten "most awesome" Mortal Kombat characters, stating that "while not nearly as unique as some of the other kombatants on the list, Sonya Blade is integral to some of the more interesting story-threads in the Mortal Kombat universe", citing her pursuit of Kano. In 2012, "the hot, butch" Sonya was given eighth place on UGO's list of top Mortal Kombat characters. That same year, she was at seventh place on Cheat Code Central's list of top Mortal Kombat "kombatants", along with a comment that "the badass army chick was all the rage back in the 1990s, but now she's part of a dwindling number of female characters that really kick ass." Her "Double Split" in the 2011 game was included by FHM on their list of nine most brutal Fatalities in the game. Sonya placed 18th in a 2013 Dorkly poll for top Mortal Kombat characters, noted as one "of the more grounded and strong-willed characters in MK history." In 2014, GamesRadar called her "Mortal Kombat's leading lady". Similarly, including her as the only female in his 2015 list of ten most iconic Mortal Kombat characters, GameRant's Jason Gallagher opined that Sonya, "with all due respect to Kitana, Jade, and Mileena, is still the most recognizable female character in franchise history today. She's played a large role in various ongoing storylines, and is one-half of the reason Cassie Cage exists today. The Special Forces crew has expanded greatly over the last two decades, but it was Sonya that started it all."

Sonya's fight with Kano in the first Mortal Kombat film was rated as the 19th best cinematic fight scene by UGO in 2010. Ranking this scene as the best in this film, UGO also commented that "Sonya Blade has always been sort of an also-ran character in the Mortal Kombat franchise, taking second place to the busty ninja sisters Kitana and Mileena. But the movies gave her a chance to shine." In 2011, Complex ranked Wilson's role as Sonya at 12th place on the list of "hottest women in video game movies", but with likeness factor of only 29% (as compared to Sonya's later appearance in the video game Mortal Kombat vs. DC Universe). On the other hand, 1UP.com's Retronauts opined Wilson was miscast and not convincing in the role, and Leonard Pitts cited Sonya being captured and taken hostage in the first film as a prime example in his 1995 article alleging that "sexism still prevails in action movies."

See also
List of Mortal Kombat characters
Cammy White (Street Fighter) and Sarah Bryant (Virtua Fighter'')
United States Army Special Forces in popular culture
Women warriors in literature and culture

References

External links

Action film characters
Female characters in video games
Fictional German American people
Fictional United States Army Special Forces personnel
Fictional characters from Austin, Texas
Fictional eskrimadors
Fictional female generals
Fictional female lieutenants
Fictional female martial artists
Fictional kenpō practitioners
Fictional police officers in video games
Fictional soldiers in video games
Fictional stick-fighters
Fictional taekwondo practitioners
Mortal Kombat characters
Twin characters in video games
Video game characters based on real people
Video game characters introduced in 1992
Video game protagonists
Woman soldier and warrior characters in video games